Matthew David Kroul (born February 25, 1986) is a former American football offensive guard. He was signed as an undrafted free agent by the New York Jets in 2009. He played college football at Iowa, and high school at Mount Vernon High School.

Professional career

New York Jets
Kroul was signed to the Jets' practice squad on December 30, 2010.

Prior to the 2011 NFL Season, the Jets converted Kroul from a defensive lineman to an offensive lineman. He was waived on September 3, 2011. Kroul was signed to the team's practice squad on September 4. He was released on October 25. He was re-signed to the practice squad on October 31. Kroul signed a future/reserve contract with the team on January 3, 2012. On August 31, 2012, he was waived.

References

External links
New York Jets: Matt Kroul
Player Bio: Matt Kroul - Iowa Official Athletic Website
LeVar Woods Football Academy Bio

Living people
1986 births
Iowa Hawkeyes football players
Players of American football from Iowa
American football defensive tackles
New York Jets players
People from Mount Vernon, Iowa